Avadi is a suburb of Chennai within Chennai Metropolitan Area limit, located in the Thiruvallur district of Tamil Nadu, India. It is surrounded by major defence establishments and is home to various universities and engineering colleges. The city is served by Avadi Railway Station of the Chennai Suburban Railway. As of 2011, Avadi had a population of 345,996, which is 10th most populous place in Tamil Nadu. It is home to the Heavy Vehicles Factory (HVF), Ordnance Factory Board (ODF) which houses Engine Factory and Combat Vehicles Research and Development Establishment (CVRDE). The lake in Avadi was known as Paaleripattu, which is now found only in very old land documents.

Etymology
The exact origin of the name 'Avadi' is not known. One version has it that it is the combination of "Aa" (meaning cow) and "Adi or gudi (kudi)" (meaning place in Tamil), indicating that the place had many cows.
AVADI stands for Armed Vehicles Ammunition Depot of INDIA
One of the more popular theories about the origin of the name is that it is an acronym for "Armoured Vehicles and Ammunition Depot of India". However, this is most likely a backronym invented more recently. The entity "Armoured Vehicles and Ammunition Depot of India" does not appear in any British records.

Several British documents from the 19th century refer to the place as "Avady", which doesn't match the widely circulated acronym theory. The name Avadi (Avady) was already in use by 1856, when the first public railway was opened in the Madras Presidency. This predates the transfer of the Madras Presidency's arsenal from Fort St. George, India in the city of Madras, to Avadi, which was done sometime after 1870, which contradicts the popular acronym theory.

History
The neighbourhood is part of the "auto belt" that developed when the automobile industry developed in Madras, primarily in the city's industrial north and west regions, in the early post-World War II years.

The famous session of the Indian National Congress was held at Avadi on 10 January 1955. This historical meet emphasised the importance of socialism and its impact on social development. Jawaharlal Nehru with Morarji Desai and other Congress leaders at the AICC session declared that a socialistic pattern of society was the goal of the Congress.

Geography

Lake 

Avadi has a lake called Paruthipattu Lake. It was once a source of water for farmland irrigation. The body of water attracts many birds throughout the year. However, in the recent decades it has lost most of its area to indiscriminate building and encroachment. The Paruthippattu Lake area was renovated with a budget of 32 crores and converted into an eco-park that officially opened on 19 June 2019. The renovation added recreational facilities, a 3-km-long walking track, a central plaza and various greenery, while addressing the issues of encroachment and sewage pollution that had affected the once-neglected lake.

Waste management
The neighborhood generates about 150 metric tonnes of garbage daily. Together with Thiruninravur and Poonamallee, Avadi generates about 210 metric tonnes of solid waste from around 120,000 households, which is dumped on a 17.78-acre site in Sekkadu, owned by the Avadi Municipal Corporation. In 2017, the municipal corporation planned to construct 33 decentralized compost processing plants at a cost of  109.6 million, each with a capacity to convert 4 tonnes of biodegradable waste into manure. Of these, 17 plants were operational as of February 2018.

IT Parks and Companies

IT Park 

A new Tidel Park, with a built-up area of 5,57,000 square feet, will be built on a 10-acre land at a cost of  2,300 million at Avadi–Pattabiram on MTH Road. This is expected to provide jobs for 30,000 people. The Construction work started in August 2020. Dell Technology and Tata Consultancy Service (TCS) have shown interest to move to Avadi. iDEX a Central Government IT Company for Defence export is expected to invest 1000 crores in Tidel Park Avadi - Pattabiram.

In addition to military establishments, Avadi also houses a number of IT/ITES and other service sector-based firms.

Defence Industrial Corridor 

The major defence establishments with divisions in Avadi are the Indian Air Force, Indian Army, Heavy Vehicles Factory (HVF), EFA-Engine Factory, Combat Vehicles Research and Development Establishment (CVRDE), Central Reserve Police Force (CRPF), Indian Navy, Central Vehicle Depot (CVD), The Ordnance Depot (OD), Unfit Vehicles Park (UVP) and the Ordnance Clothing Factory (OCF).

The Indian Air Force has a Mechanical Transport Training Institute Technical (MTTI) here for training its personnel on driving and repairing vehicles, and also a base repair depot for repair and maintenance of its various equipment. CVRDE undertakes major research on battle tanks and other combat vehicles. MBT Arjuns, armoured ambulances, Combat Improved Ajeyas and Nag anti-tank missiles are some of the recent products from CVRDE. The Heavy Vehicles Factory produces an indigenous version of the T-72 tank known as Ajeya. HVF also produces the main battle tank Arjun. The production of T-90S Bhishma tanks started in 2006–2007. The Tamil Nadu Special Police (TSP) also has a division in Avadi, the TN 2nd and 5th Battalion.

There was a World War II airfield at Red Hills, Sholavaram, approachable from the junction close to the CRPF Camp, Avadi, immediately after the Military Hospital.

Manufacturing Industrial Hub  
Avadi is around 7 km from Ambattur Industrial Estate and 22 km from Sriperambudur - Irungattukottai Sipcot Industrial Park.

Demographics

According to the 2011 census, Avadi had a population of 345,996 with a sex-ratio of 970 females for every 1,000 males, well above the national average of 929. A total of 36,091 were under the age of six, constituting 18,419 males and 17,672 females. Scheduled Castes and Scheduled Tribes accounted for 16.16% and 0.63% of the population respectively. The average literacy of the city was 81.76%, compared to the national average of 72.99%. The city had a total of 87,733 households. There were a total of 127,152 workers, comprising 787 cultivators, 1,095 main agricultural labourers, 1,444 in household industries, 111,013 other workers, 12,813 marginal workers, 221 marginal cultivators, 310 marginal agricultural labourers, 449 marginal workers in household industries and 11,833 other marginal workers. As per the religious census of 2011, Avadi had 84.23% Hindus, 4.56% Muslims, 10.69% Christians, 0.07% Sikhs, 0.03% Buddhists, 0.08% Jains, 0.3% following other religions and 0.03% following no religion or did not indicate any religious preference.

From 229,403 in 2001, the population of Avadi grew to 344,701 in 2011, registering a decadal population growth of 50%.

Places of worship
There are many Hindu temples in and around Avadi. Karumari Amman temple, Chinnamman temple, Nagavalli Amman and Perumal temple are famous temples in Avadi. Many old generation temples are also present in and around Avadi. Thirumullaivoyal, a locality near Avadi, is famous for Masilamaniswara Temple, Thirumullaivoyal, an ancient temple of Lord Shiva, as well as Pachaiamman Temple. Vaikundhanaadhar Temple is located near Kovilpathagai; Angaalamman Temple is located on the Redhills road. Sri Venkateswara Perumal Temple in Kamaraj Nagar is a Vaishnavite shrine in Avadi.

A handful of mosques serve a considerable Islamic population in Avadi. There are some churches over 50 years old, including Marthoma Church in Gandhi Nagar, CSI, RC and Orthodox Churches in HVF road. Also, numerous churches have been built in recent years; St Antony's Shrine is a Catholic church located at Avadi Check-post. There is a Jain temple, Vasupujiya Jain Temple, and a Gurudwara in the HVF estate for the Sikhs to worship in Avadi.

Avadi boasts of cultural and religious diversity and has a proud heritage of religious tolerance.

Transport

Railways 

Avadi railway station is one of the important suburban terminal stations of the Chennai Suburban Railway Network. It lies on the Chennai Jolarpettai Mainline. Few express trains like Thiruvananthapuram Chennai Mail, Alappuzha Chennai Express, Chennai- Mangalore superfast express and Tirupati Chennai Garudadri stops at Avadi. The proximity of the MTC bus terminus to the railway station has led many commuters to choose Avadi as a transit point. Avadi railway station has the seventh highest footfall in Southern Railways with numbers exceeding 75,000 per day.

Suburban services
Avadi is connected very well with rest of the city by EMU trains. There are frequent suburban trains from Avadi to Chennai Central, Chennai Beach, Arakonam, Thiruvallur, Tiruthani and Velachery. By rail, Avadi is 45 minutes from Chennai Central, 24 minutes from Perambur and 15 minutes from Villivakkam. Some trains originate from here as Avadi has an EMU Shed, which handles the majority of the suburban train operations on the Northern and Western line. The Western line has 229 services a day and the North line has 83, which accounts 312 trains.

Roadways

Chennai–Tiruttani highway extension 
The Tamil Nadu Highways department issued a GO on 4 October 2013 to extending the entire Chennai – Tiruttani highway to 6 lanes at a cost of ₹1.68 billion. The first phase will involve extending the road to 4 lanes – 100 ft with center median and encroachments have already started to be removed. The road junction at Avadi Checkpost connects Avadi Poonamallee road with the CTH road. The Chennai Outer ring road (ORR) passes through western part of Avadi.

Avadi Bus Terminus
Avadi bus terminus is located very near to the Avadi railway station on the Chennai - Thiruvallur High Road (CTH road). The depot is situated beside the bus terminal. Avadi is well connected to various locations of Chennai as well as rural areas surrounding North-western and Western Chennai. The main service provider though is the state-owned Metropolitan Transport Corporation buses, TNSTC/SETC buses to Tirupathi, Nellore, Bangalore, Shengottai, Tirunelveli, Tuticorin operates from here & few private buses are also available.

Share Autos
Share Autos are one of the popular modes of transport there. Share Autos are mostly spotted near Avadi bus terminal and Checkpost junction. They usually ply between Poonamallee, Karayanchavadi, Pattabiram, Thiruninravur, Anna Nagar, Nungambakkam and Koyambedu.

Educational institutions 
Avadi has been a place of importance when it comes to educational institutions. Plenty of CBSE and Tamil Nadu State board schools are there in its vicinity.

Schools
 Government Girls Higher Secondary school
 Government Boys Higher Secondary school
 Nabi Crescent Matriculation School, Avadi.
 Holy Immanuel Matriculation School
 Holy Immanuel Matriculation School 
 Kendriya Vidyalaya: OCF, AFS, CRPF, and HVF.
 Kendriya Vidyalaya CRPF, Avadi.
 Air Force School, Avadi
 Sri Venkateshwara Matriculation Higher Secondary School
 Immaculate Heart of Mary Girls Higher Secondary School
 Jaigopal Garodia Vivekananda Vidyalaya
 Vijayanta Higher Secondary School
 Vijayanta Senior Secondary School
 Vijayantha Model Higher Secondary School
 St. Joseph's Matriculation School
 DAV Matriculation Higher Secondary School
 D. S. Selvam Matriculation School
 Velammal Vidyalaya
 VGN Chinmaya Vidhyalaya 
 Sudharsanam Vidyaashram
 Maharishi Vidya Mandir
 Aditya Vidyashram
 Roman Catholic Mission Matriculation School
 Great Harvest vidyalaya
 St. Pauls Matriculation School
 Nazareth Matriculation Higher Secondary School
 Veltech Dr.RR & Dr.SR Matriculation Higher Secondary school
 The Nazareth Academy
 Ordnance Clothing Factor school
 RMK Senior secondary school
 Sri Ramakrishna matriculation school

Colleges
 Veltech Rangarajan and Dr.Sakunthala R&D Institute of Science and Technology
 Veltech Multitech
 Veltech Hightech
 Veltech School of Law and School of Communication
 Veltech College of Engineering
 Murugappa Polytechnic College
 St. Peter's College of Engineering and Technology
 Mahalashmi Women's College of Arts & Science
 Veltech Rangarajan Sangunthala Arts College
 Aalim Muhammed Salegh College of Engineering (Nizara Educational Campus)
 Nazareth College of Arts and Science
 Dharmamurthi Rao Bahadur Calavala Cunnan Chetty Hindu College
 S. A. Engineering College
 S. A. College of arts and science

State assembly constituency 
Avadi is a state assembly constituency in Tamil Nadu, India, formed after constituency delimitation.[1] The areas included are Poonamalle Taluk (partially), Pattabiram, Thirunindravur, Tiruverkadu and Avadi (M). It is included in the Thiruvallur parliamentary constituency.

Entertainment

Cinema theatres
Avadi has a handful of movie theaters in its locality:

Meenakshi Cinemas
Remy Cinemas

The managing director of Carnival Cinemas, at a press meet during the launch of EVP Carnival Cinemas, Chembarambakkam, confirmed that EVP Carnival cinemas was coming up with a 5 screen multiplex near Avadi soon. The exact location is not known yet.

References

External links
 Avadi at Tiruvallur district website

Neighbourhoods in Chennai
Suburbs of Chennai
Geography of Chennai
Cities and towns in Tiruvallur district